Brittany "Ice" Hrynko (born April 24, 1993) is an American basketball player, currently signed with the Philadelphia Reign of the Women's Basketball Development Association since 2019 and has also played with the Harlem Globetrotters since 2018. She was drafted by the Connecticut Sun of the Women's National Basketball Association in the 2015 WNBA Draft. She was then traded to the Atlanta Dream, but was released and later signed short-term contracts with the San Antonio Stars and Tulsa Shock. From 2015 to 2018 she signed with teams in Israel, Slovakia, Italy and Germany.

College
In Hrynko's final season at DePaul she averaged 19.1 points per game. She is DePaul's ninth WNBA draft pick.

DePaul statistics

Source

Personal life
As of late May 2015, she has almost 30 tattoos.

References

External links
Brittany Hrynko Bio - DePaul University Official Athletic Site
Brittany Hrynko - WNBA

1993 births
Living people
American women's basketball players
Basketball players from Philadelphia
Connecticut Sun draft picks
DePaul Blue Demons women's basketball players
Guards (basketball)
San Antonio Stars players
Tulsa Shock players